Karin Beyer (born 30 July 1941) is a retired East German swimmer. She set three world records in the 100 m (1958, 1:20.3 and 1:19.6) and 200 m (1961, 2:48.0) breaststroke events. At the 1958 European Championships she finished fourth in the 4×100 m medley relay. The same year she was selected as East German Sportspersonality of the Year.

Between 1961 and 1965 she studied physiotherapy at a medical institute in Leipzig and later worked as a coach, retiring in 2002. She lives in Halle.

References

1941 births
Living people
German female swimmers
East German female breaststroke swimmers
People from Halberstadt
Sportspeople from Saxony-Anhalt